Eva Carolina Arias Viñas (born April 1, 1985, in Moca) is a Dominican model and beauty pageant titleholder who was crowned Miss Dominican Republic 2010 and represented her country in the 2010 Miss Universe pageant.

Miss Dominican Republic 
Arias participated in the Miss Dominican Republic 2006 pageant, representing Espaillat, and she placed 1st Runner-Up to Mía Taveras of Santiago and won the Best Fashion Look award.

After the pageant, Arias left her country and went on to model in Italy and several other countries for four years. She eventually came back and re-entered her country's national beauty pageant, once again representing Espaillat, and was crowned Miss Dominican Republic 2010.

Miss Universe 2010
As the official representative of her country to the 2010 Miss Universe pageant broadcast live from Las Vegas, Nevada on August 23, Arias participated as one of the 83 delegates who vied for the crown of eventual winner, Ximena Navarrete of Mexico.

References

External links
Eva Arias at Collection Model Management

1985 births
Living people
People from Espaillat Province
People from Moca, Dominican Republic
Miss Dominican Republic
Miss Universe 2010 contestants
Dominican Republic female models
Dominican Republic beauty pageant winners